is an interchange passenger railway station located in the city of Iga, Mie Prefecture, Japan, operated by West Japan Railway Company (JR-West).

Lines
Iga-Ueno Station is served by the JR Kansai Main Line and is located 94.5 rail kilometres from the terminus of the line at Nagoya Station and 34.6 rail kilometers from Kameyama Station. It is also a terminus of the Iga Railway Iga Line and is 16.6 rail kilometers from the opposing terminus of that line at Iga-Kambe Station.

Layout
The station consists of a side platform which is cut away on one side to form a semi-bay platform, and in an island platform with four tracks on the ground level, connected by a footbridge. The Iga Line track is electrified but the Kansai Line tracks are not. The station has a Midori no Madoguchi staffed ticket office.

Platforms

Adjacent stations

History
The line was nationalized on October 1, 1907, becoming part of the Imperial Government Railways (IGR), which became Japan National Railways (JNR) after World War II. The station name was changed to its present name on September 11, 1916. Freight operations were discontinued from February 1, 1984. With the privatization of JNR on April 1, 1987, the station came under the control of West Japan Railway Company (JR-West).

The Iga Railway began operations on August 8, 1916. Through a series of mergers, the line became part of the Kintetsu group by June 1, 1944, but was spun-out as an independent company again on October 1, 2007.

Passenger statistics
In fiscal 2019, the JR station was used by an average of 525 passengers daily and the Iga Railway portion by 278 passengers daily (boarding passengers only).

See also
 List of railway stations in Japan

Surrounding area
Japan National Route 422
Kizu River
Tsuge River

See also
List of railway stations in Japan

References

External links

  
 Iga Railway official website  

Railway stations in Japan opened in 1897
Railway stations in Mie Prefecture
Iga, Mie